Dr. Anil Bhan is the Chairman of Cardiac Surgery Heart Institute, Medanta Hospital, Gurugram, India. He graduated from Medical College Srinagar. He has the largest experience in aortic surgery in India since he has designed and developed more than 50 surgical instruments in the field of cardiac surgery. He was one of the team members to perform the first successful heart transplant in India in1994. He served as a co-founder of Max Heart and Vascular Institute, Saket, New Delhi, Director and Chief Co-Ordinator, Cardio thoracic and Vascular Surgery, MHVI, Saket.Additional Professor, Cardiothoracic Surgery and Vascular Surgery, AIIMS, New Delhi.

Early life and education

Awards and recognitions

Dr. Bhan studied in C.M.S. Tyndale Biscoe School, Srinagar. He was awarded the certificate of Honor as "Best All Round Boy" in school. Also awarded Certificate of Honor for Best Performance in Matriculation. Stood First in Kashmir Province. He is a graduate from Medical College Srinagar – Distinction holder in Pharmacology, Pathology, Forensic Medicine, Internal Medicine, Surgery and Gynae/Obst. He did his Internship from Christian Medical College Vellore. He worked as a Pool Officer in Cardiothoracic and Vascular Surgery, All India Institute of Medical Sciences.

He is recipient of Certificate of distinction for first rank in Pre – Medical Examination of University of Kashmir, received certificate of distinction for securing first position in order of merit in MBBS examination of University of Kashmir.

National awards

 Awarded "Silver Medal" at P.G.I. Chandigarh for first order performance in M.S.,General Surgery examination.
 Awarded life Time Achievement Award at the world Congress of clinical and Preventive Cardiology, 2006. Conferred by former President of India Dr. A.P.J. Abdul Kalam in Rashtrapati Bhawan.
 Conferred the P K Sen Oration in 2009 by the Indian Association of Cardiovascular Surgery.
 Conferred the K.N.Dastur Oration in 2013 by the Indian Association of Cardiovascular Surgery.
 Awarded Life Time Achievement award by the Human Care Charitable Trust in 2014.
 Awarded Life Time Achievement Award by KECESS, Kashmir Education, Cultural and Science Society in view of my outstanding contribution in the field of Medical Sciences 2015.
 Awarded DMA Chikitsa Ratan Award by Delhi Medical Association in 2014.
 Felicitated by the Society of Heart Failure and Transplantation in Kochi, 2016 in recognition of the contribution in the Thoracic organ Transplantation in India.
 Felicitated by the Kashmir Medicos – Old Students Forum on 1 Dec 2007 for my outstanding and meritorious Services to Medical profession.
 Felicitation in view of my valuable contribution in Indian organ Donation and Awareness Program in Year 2015.
 IMA-New Delhi Branch, Distinguished Service Award for my contribution to CME promotion – 18th March2007.
 Awarded Magnanimous Award for outstanding contribution in the field of cardiac and thoracic surgery by IMA Academy of Medical Specialities, Sept. 2007
 Appreciation award by Rotary Clubs of Faridabad in 2005. District 3010
 Received "Nagrik Abhinandan" by the Gauravgatha Abhinandan Samaroh Samiti in 2010 at Agra.

Contributions
 Part of the team that conducted the first successful Heart Transplantation in India under Professor Panangipalli Venugopal on 3 August 1994.
 Conducted the youngest Coronary Artery Bypass Surgery for patient aged 20 months.
 Modified Circuit for Retrograde Central Perfusion- Asian Cardiovascular Thoracic Annals, 2003, March:11(1);85-86 (Aortic surgery program).

Coronary Artery Bypass Surgery (CABG)
 Published one of the earliest reports on angiographic follow-up of OPCAB (Beating Heart CABG) from India. Accredited by Medtronics(U.S.A.).(Annals of Thoracic Surgery.2000;vol.69(4): 1216–1221).
 Published third report in the world literature on Radial artery angiographic follow up. (Annals Thoracic Surgery.1999;67(6):1631–1636)
 Published the data on adenosine preconditioning of the Myocardium in patients with ventricular dysfunction undergoing myocardial revascularization.(Eur. J of Cardiothoracic Surgery. 2001;19(1):41-6.)
 Used for the first time Harmonic scalpel for the harvest of Radial and Internal mammary Artery conduits in India. (Asian Cardiovascular and Thoracic Annals. March, 7;(2001))

Pediatric cardiac surgery
 Described a new – operative technique for repair of supracardiac total anomalous pulmonary venous drainage. (Published in Annals of thoracic surgery- USA)
 Described a new operative technique for coarctation of aortic with type – B aortic dissection(Journal of Thoracic and Cardiovascular Surgery USA)

Breakthrough cases

 11-month-old Nigerian baby undergoes rare heart surgery.
 3-Month-Old Gets New Life After Heart Surgery – 12 May 2007
 Heart Bypass Surgery Done on 20-Month-Old – 29 May 2009
 20-Month-Old Boy Undergoes Bypass
 Rare Heart Surgery Performed on Infant
 Indore creates record with first heart transplantation
 Total arterial revascularization in a child with familial homozygous hypercholesterolemia

Instruments designed

Designed and developed more than 50 instruments for minimally invasive cardiac surgery. Thoracic and thoraco-abdominal aortic aneurysms, mitral valve surgery and the beating heart coronary artery bypass surgery.

References

University of Kashmir alumni
Academic staff of the All India Institute of Medical Sciences, New Delhi
Indian cardiac surgeons
Year of birth missing (living people)
Living people